Sunnies Studios is a Philippine-based lifestyle brand that began as a product line of sunglasses. Founded in 2013, Sunnies Studios has since expanded to offering prescription eyeglasses, and has ventured into the makeup industry, with Sunnies Face, and the food industry, with Sunnies Cafe. They maintain 127 stores in the Philippines and Vietnam, as well as an online store that extends its reach to Hong Kong, Thailand, Vietnam, Malaysia, Singapore, and Indonesia.

History
In 2011, entrepreneurial couple Eric Dee and Bea Soriano-Dee started Charlie, a retail brand that sold shoes, bags, and clothes. By 2013, model and host Georgina Wilson joined the team as a marketing director along with Wilson's cousin, fashion designer Martine Cajucom, as the creative director. Together, they rebranded the company and started selling sunglasses under the line, Sunnies by Charlie. By February 2014, the directors decided to change the company name to Sunnies Studios and dropped Charlie due to the increasing popularity of the sunglasses line. They relocated and upgraded their headquarters, which is currently located in Libis , Quezon City, Philippines.

In 2016, Sunnies Studios launched a prescription eyewear arm under the name Sunnies Specs Optical. By June, the brand became the third-most followed retail brand on Instagram in the Philippines, having amassed around 240,000 followers.

In March 2019, Sunnies Studios launched its first multi-brand concept store in SM City Cebu, containing Sunnies Studios, Sunnies Specs Optical, Sunnies Face, and Cup Point within one store.

Sunglasses and prescription eye wear

The brand currently has over 200 styles with all Sunnies products being designed in-house. They are currently sold in over 120 retail locations around the Philippines. In September 2018, the team opened its second international location for Sunnies Studios in Vietnam (Sunnies has silently been available in Guam for some time).

According to Euromonitor, in 2015, Sunnies Studios was ranked second in the Philippine market for sunglasses behind category leader Luxottica Group SpA. Sunnies Studios had an 8% value share in that sector. It was also ranked 10th in eye wear with a 1% value share in 2015.

In March 2017, Sunnies Studios launched the actress, Liza Soberano as the brand's first official endorser for Sunnies. Later on in 2018, Sunnies Studios revealed local celebrity, James Reid as their newest celebrity endorser.

Brand extensions

Cup Point
Cup Point was first launched as part of the Sunnies Studios concept store in Cebu. Cup Point was created by Sunnies Specs Optical to support customers' wait time while their prescription eye wear is being processed.

Sunnies Face
Sunnies Face is a cruelty-free beauty line, launched in August 2018. The brand was launched with Fluffmatte, a range of modern matte lipsticks.They have since expanded their line to include Airblush (soft-focus cheek tint), Lip Dip (whipped matte lip cream), Play Paint (vegan quick-dry nail polish), The Perfector (skin-perfecting duo), Lip Treat (sheer lip glow), Face Glass (liquid luminizer), Life brow Micromarker (liquid brow precision pencil), Eye Crayon (multi-purpose eyeshadow stick), and Dream Cream (gel cream moisturizer). 

The brand has six online markets and is present in five countries with 17 physical stores.

Sunnies Cafe

In 2016, Sunnies Studios ventured into the food industry with the opening of Sunnies Cafe. Sunnies Cafe opened its first store in Bonifacio Global City and its second store in SM Megamall. A third restaurant opened at Ala bang Town Center by January 2017. The menu consists of comfort food with a modern twist and is constantly being updated with new dishes.

Sunnies World
In September 2019, Sunnies Studios opened their first flagship store, Sunnies World. The  space is their largest store, located at SM Mega Fashion Hall.

Controversies
Following the launch of Fluff mate in 2018, netizens noted similarities in aesthetic, branding, and marketing to that of cosmetics company Glossier, founded by American blogger Emily Weiss. Netizens described Sunnies Face as a "copycat" of Glossier. In particular, Sunnies' minimalist packaging style and their marketing strategy of releasing the supply of their products at limited intervals were alleged to have been replicated from Glossier. Creative director Martine Cajucom responded to the issue in a Bustle interview, acknowledging the similarities and calling Glossier to be one of their inspirations for the brand in "changing the skincare conversation".  

In November 2020, a hashtag calling for a boycott of the Sunnies brand trended on Philippine social media after a Facebook post that circulated among Filipino netizens disclosed allegations of former Sunnies Studios employees not receiving their separation pay. At least two former employees of a branch in Cauayan , Isabela, that closed down in March due to the COVID-19 pandemic, alleged that they had not received any response from the company since the termination of their employment. However, the publisher of the viral Facebook post later updated it to reveal that the management of Sunnies Studios had settled the issue with the employees.

References

Eyewear brands of the Philippines
Retail companies of the Philippines
Companies based in Quezon City
Eyewear companies of the Philippines
Cosmetics companies of the Philippines